Varshava is a rural locality (a settlement) in Nikolsky Selsoviet, Zmeinogorsky District, Altai Krai, Russia. It is part of the Nikolsky Selsoviet. There are 2 streets.

History 
Founded in 1922. In 1928 it consisted of 74 households with the main population being Russians. In 1931, it consisted of 83 households and was still part of the same selsoviet in the same raion.

Geography 
Varshava is located 47 km northwest of Zmeinogorsk (the district's administrative centre) by road. Talovka and Nikolsk are the nearest rural localities.

References 

Rural localities in Zmeinogorsky District